Opsound is a website which aggregates links to music released under Creative Commons licenses. Opsound aggregates links to music hosted on other servers, as well as providing discussion forums and organizing real-world events and concerts. It has published one CD by the artist Catalpa Catalpa entitled "Hardoncity."

Opsound is a social art project of Sal Randolph, who created the site to provide a space for open, uncurated collaboration between musicians and sound artists.  It is described on the site as "a gift economy in action, an experiment in applying the model of free software to music."

Lawrence Lessig has often mentioned Opsound when discussing Creative Commons, citing its structure and licensing as a positive aid to enhanced collaboration and communication between artists.

Opsound does not host works, leaving that to others such as the Internet Archive's Netlabels collection. Metadata includes descriptions of songs and artists, track numbers, and indexed keywords associated with songs. All songs are available under the Creative Commons Attribution-ShareAlike license (typically version 2.5, but sometimes only older versions of the license). Some songs are licensed under the more liberal Attribution license. Popularity charts were added around the end of 2003 and the beginning of 2004. A redesign of the site was implemented towards the end of 2005. Popular artists include _aa_, Binary Beats, and the Evolution Control Committee. There are plans to add software for so-called "microlabels" to allow people to create their own albums from the sound pool.

References

External links
  
 

Creative Commons-licensed websites
American music websites